The Pakistan national ball hockey team is the national ball hockey team of Pakistan and is controlled by the Pakistan Street and Ball Hockey Federation. Pakistan's Program has steadily grown and has gone on to win two gold medals in 2007 and 2011 in Pool B. In 2013 Pakistan was awarded the Pool A Status

History

Parents and grandparents grew up in Pakistan playing and watching cricket. They were either born in Canada or arrived in Canada at a very young age and invariably loved ice hockey as all Canadians do. Being new immigrants most Pakistanis could not afford to play ice hockey so they took to the playgrounds, streets, and parking lots to play ball hockey. The sport has evolved over the years from a street sport to the very highly organized and competitive leagues of today at the Regional, Provincial and National levels. To take it a step further, over the last decade, ball hockey has reached its highest level possible, the world championships.

Awards and honors

Gold Medals
2011 - Team Pakistan - B-Pool (Slovakia)
2007 - Team Pakistan - B-Pool (Germany)

Tournament MVP
2011 - Ijaz Chaudhry - Slovakia

All Star Team
2011 - Bilal Buttar - Slovakia

Goaltender of the Tournament
2011 - Raza Zaidi - Slovakia

2013 Roster 

Coaching Staff
Christopher Pinto  —  Head Coach
Naiem Malik  —  Assistant Coach
Ali Wadee  —  Player Development
Brian Lucas  —  Player Development
Joe Lucas  —  Player Development

Executives
Naveed Mohammad — General Manager
Safi Habib — Media/PR Director
Muhammad Afzal Javed — Pakistan General Secretary/Player Development

Goaltenders
Raza Zaidi
Ibad Khan

Defencemen

Ijaz Chaudhry
Bilal Buttar
Zafir Rashid
Farooq Khan
Mustafa Alam
Yusuf Azmi
Salih Azmi
Fahad Mallik

Forwards
Sajjid Ayubi
Usama Mahmood
Imran Patel
Osman Buttar
Teepu Kidwai
Munawar Hamdani
Omar Sabri
Shane Khan
Safi Ahmed
Mohammed Bilal
Sophian Mian
Nazir Lasania
Shaukat Khan
Camran Baig
Waqas Khan

References

External links
 Official website

Ball hockey
Ball hockey